Helen Oettingen ( 1887 Ukraine or Venice - 1950 Paris) was a French painter and writer.

She is also known as a poet under the pseudonym Leonardo Pieu, as a novelist under the pseudonym Roch Grey, and as a painter under the pseudonym François Angiboult.

She studied at the Académie Julian. In the 1910s, she held a literary salon, at 229 Boulevard Raspail . She helped save Les Soirées de Paris, with Serge Férat. She met Ardengo Soffici. and De Chirico. She lived at La Ruche.

Her work was exhibited at the Pushkin Museum.

Works 

 Le Château de l'étang rouge, Roch Grey, illuminated with wood engraved by Survage.
 « L'Homme, la ville, le voyage » a text published in the magazine SIC.
 Chevaux de minuit, thirteen poems illustrated by Picasso in 1936 and published by Iliazd.
 Roch Grey,Le Château de l’Étang rouge, Les Trois lacs, L’Âge de fer, Billet circulaire ,Foreword by Isabel Violante, Paris, Conti, 2010.
 Roch Grey, Photographies verbales : Écrits sur l’art et les artistes (1913-1956),Introduction by Isabel Violante, Paris, Le Minotaure, 2016, 128 pp.

Further reading 

 Hélène d'Ottingen, known as Roch Grey, Diary of a Stranger, introduction and ed. by Barbara Meazzi
 Serge Férat, Letters to Hélène d'Oettingen, translated from Russian, presented and annotated by Régis Gayraud, Paris, Le Minotaure, 2016, 111 p.
 Ardengo Soffici, Serge Férat, Hélène d'Ogttingen, Correspondence 1903-1964, editions established by Barbara Meazzi, Lausanne, L'Age d'Homme, 2013.

References 

1950 deaths
1887 births
20th-century French novelists
20th-century French painters
20th-century French poets
French women novelists
French women painters
French women poets
Pseudonymous women writers
Pseudonymous artists
20th-century pseudonymous writers